John Robert Williamson (October 9, 1942 – July 11, 2020) was an American football player who played professionally as a linebacker for seven seasons for the Oakland Raiders and Boston Patriots.

Williamson died in Houston, Texas on July 11, 2020, at the age of 79.

References

1942 births
2020 deaths
People from El Dorado, Arkansas
Players of American football from Arkansas
American football linebackers
El Dorado High School (Arkansas) alumni
Louisiana Tech Bulldogs football players
Oakland Raiders players
Boston Patriots players
American Football League players